WZTQ (1560 AM, "Joy Christian Radio") was a radio station licensed to serve Centre, Alabama. The station was owned by Joy Christian Communications, Inc. It aired a Southern Gospel music format.

History
This station signed on as WAGC, a 1,000 watt daytime-only AM station broadcasting at 1560 kHz under the ownership of Radio Centre, Inc. The station signed on with a country & western music format which it maintained throughout the remainder of the 1960s and all of the 1970s.

In August 2003, Radio Centre, Inc., reached an agreement to sell WAGC to Joy Christian Communications, Inc. As part of the deal, they had the Federal Communications Commission (FCC) change the station's callsign to WZTQ on September 12, 2003. The sale was approved by the FCC on November 24, 2003, and the transaction was consummated on December 1, 2003.

This station was assigned the WLYJ call letters by the FCC on September 17, 2007, when it swapped with then-sister station WZTQ (now WJLX). It took on the WZTQ call letters again on February 23, 2012 On May 16, 2013, the station changed to the WLYG call sign, and back again to the current WZTQ on October 13, 2014. WZTQ's license was surrendered to the FCC by Joy Christian Communications on May 10, 2016, and cancelled by the FCC on June 28, 2016.

References

External links
FCC Station Search Details: DWZTQ (Facility ID: 54521)
FCC History Cards for WZTQ (covering 1960-1981 as WAGC)

ZTQ
Radio stations established in 1962
Cherokee County, Alabama
1962 establishments in Alabama
Defunct radio stations in the United States
Radio stations disestablished in 2016
2016 disestablishments in Alabama
Defunct religious radio stations in the United States
ZTQ
ZTQ